Marinko Galič (born 22 April 1970) is a Slovenian former professional footballer who played as a defender. He represented his country at the two major tournaments for which they qualified, the Euro 2000 and the World Cup 2002.

Club career
Born in Koper, Galič began his career playing for FC Koper in 1991. In 1993, he joined Maribor where he played three seasons. For the first time, he moved abroad in 1996 for NK Zagreb and Dinamo Zagreb spending two seasons in Croatia before moving to Mura Murska Sobota. In 1998, he returned to Maribor for another three seasons and then he signed for Rudar Velenje before he returned for another two years for the club he started at, NK Koper. He left his country again in 2003 to play for the Chinese team Shandong Luneng and for the Cypriot team Apollon Limassol. After a short spell on Cyprus he returned home and played one season in the third league for Malečnik. He finished his professional career with a short spell at NK Interblock.

International career
Galič was capped 66 times for Slovenia. He was a participant at the Euro 2000 and World Cup 2002.

Honours

Maribor
Slovenian PrvaLiga: 1998–99, 1999–2000, 2000–01
Slovenian Cup: 1993–94, 1998–99

Zagreb
Croatian Cup: runner-up 1997

See also
Slovenian international players
NK Maribor players

External links
Player profile at NZS 

1970 births
Living people
Sportspeople from Koper
Slovenian footballers
Association football defenders
Slovenian PrvaLiga players
FC Koper players
NK Maribor players
Slovenian expatriate footballers
Slovenian expatriate sportspeople in Croatia
Expatriate footballers in Croatia
Croatian Football League players
GNK Dinamo Zagreb players
NK Mura players
NK Rudar Velenje players
Slovenian expatriate sportspeople in Cyprus
Expatriate footballers in Cyprus
Cypriot First Division players
Apollon Limassol FC players
NK IB 1975 Ljubljana players
Expatriate footballers in China
Slovenian expatriate sportspeople in China
Shandong Taishan F.C. players
NK Zagreb players
Slovenia international footballers
UEFA Euro 2000 players
2002 FIFA World Cup players
Chinese Super League players